Do Ouro River or Rio do Ouro may refer to:

Brazil
 Ouro River (Acre)
 Do Ouro River (Bahia)
 Do Ouro River (Goiás)
 Do Ouro River (Rio Grande do Sul)
 Do Ouro River (Santa Catarina)
 Do Ouro River (Rondônia)

Other places
 Rio do Ouro, a river in São Tomé and Príncipe

See also
 Ouro Preto River, Brazil
 Gold River (disambiguation)
 Golden River (disambiguation)